Novato San Marin is a Sonoma–Marin Area Rail Transit station in Novato, California. It opened to preview service on June 29, 2017; full commuter service commenced on August 25, 2017. It is located on the north side of the city near where San Marin Drive becomes Atherton Avenue at Redwood Avenue. This was one of two stations planned for Novato in the Initial Operating Segment of SMART service until a third was announced to be partially built for opening at a later date.

This site was selected for its proximity to Fireman's Fund Insurance Company headquarters, then one of the largest employers in the county. In SMART's planning phase, the company pledged their employees would heavily patronize the line, but would go on to move corporate operations to Petaluma before the commencement of service.

Service to the station was planned to be reduced upon completion of the Novato Downtown station. However, full service to Novato San Marin was retained after Novato Downtown opened in December 2019.

References

External links

SMART - Stations

Railway stations in the United States opened in 2017
Sonoma-Marin Area Rail Transit stations in Marin County
Novato, California